The 2021 Iga Świątek tennis season officially began on 1 February 2021 as the start of the 2021 WTA Tour. Iga Świątek entered the season as world number 17 in singles. The season saw the Polish player won two WTA singles titles and reached a career-high world number 4.

Season summary

Early hard court season
Świątek reached quarterfinals at her season opener, Gippsland Trophy, where she lost to Ekaterina Alexandrova in straight sets. She then entered Australian Open, but a bunch of unforced errors saw her lost in the fourth-round match against Simona Halep in three sets. At the Adelaide, she won her first title  of the year without dropping a set in the tournament. The result saw her break into top 15 in the single's rankings. In Miami, Świątek had an early exit, upset by Ana Konjuh in the third round in three sets.

Clay season
Świątek's next tournament was the Madrid Open, where she made her tournament debut. She reached the third round and lost to the world no. 1 Ashleigh Barty in straight sets. She then won her second title of the year at the Italian Open, defeating former champion Karolína Plíšková in just 46 minutes by sending a double-bagel. The title also saw her move into the top 10 on 17 May 2021, as world no. 9.

Świątek failed to defend her French Open singles title, but she did reach the quarterfinals, where she lost to Maria Sakkari in straight sets. However, she reached the final in doubles with her partner Bethanie Mattek-Sands, but they lost to Czech Republican pair of Barbora Krejčíková and Kateřina Siniaková in straight sets.

Grass season
Świątek participated in Eastbourne as the start of her grass season, but she was upset by Daria Kasatkina in the second round despite winning the first set. At Wimbledon, she reached fourth round, where she lost to Ons Jabeur in three sets.

US Open series
Following a second-round loss against Paula Badosa at the Summer Olympics, Świątek then had an early exit in Cincinnati, where she once again lost to Ons Jabeur. Świątek then entered the US Open and reached the fourth round, marking her the only player to have reached the second week of all four Grand Slam championships in the 2021 season.

Closing tournaments
Świątek entered the Ostrava Open as the top seed. She reached semifinals before losing to Maria Sakkari in straight sets. She subsquently lost in the fourth round match against Jeļena Ostapenko in Indian Wells. Nevertheless, Świątek still qualified WTA Finals for the first time in her career.

Świątek failed to advance into the semifinals at the WTA Finals, respectively losing to Maria Sakkari in two sets and Aryna Sabalenka in three sets. However, she did manage to wrap up her 2021 campaign with a victory over Paula Badosa. She eventually finished the season as world no. 9.

All matches

Singles matches

Doubles matches

Mixed doubles matches

Tournament schedule

Singles schedule

Doubles schedule

Mixed doubles schedule

Yearly records

Top 10 wins

Singles

Doubles

Finals

Singles: 2 (2 titles)

Doubles: 1 (1 runner-up)

Earnings

References

External links

 
 
 

2021 in Polish tennis
2021 tennis player seasons
Iga Świątek tennis seasons